KUND-FM (89.3 FM) is a radio station licensed to Grand Forks, North Dakota. It airs a format consisting of jazz, classical music and news and talk programming. KUND-FM and sister station KFJM share their coverage area with Minnesota Public Radio outlets KNTN and KQMN, both licensed to Thief River Falls, Minnesota. This makes Grand Forks one of the smallest markets with competing NPR stations.

History

KUND-FM's first license was granted, as KFJM-FM, on June 17, 1976, operating on 89.3 MHz. It was the second station licensed to the University of North Dakota, joining the original KFJM, an AM station that dated to 1923.

In 1995, the university's third station, KFJY, began broadcasting on 90.7 MHz. On August 15, 1997, all three University of North Dakota stations changed call signs. KFJM-FM became KUND-FM, while the original KFJM became KUND and KFJY on 90.7 MHz inherited the historic KFJM call letters.

In September 2018, KUND-FM, along with KFJM, was sold by the University of North Dakota to Prairie Public Radio.

References

External links
Prairie Public radio website

FCC History Cards for KUND (covering 1975-1980 as KFJM-FM)

UND-FM
UND-FM
NPR member stations
Radio stations established in 1976